Idanha  is a city on the Marion County/Linn County line in Oregon, United States, on Oregon Route 22 and the Santiam River. The population was 156 at the 2020 census.

The Marion County portion of Idanha is part of the Salem Metropolitan Statistical Area, while the Linn County portion is part of the Albany–Lebanon Micropolitan Statistical Area.

Geography

Idanha encompasses the area of New Idanha in Linn County, which the USGS classifies as a separate populated place.

Climate
This region experiences warm and dry summers, with no average monthly temperatures above .  According to the Köppen Climate Classification system, Idanha has a warm-summer Mediterranean climate, abbreviated "Csb" on climate maps.

Demographics

2010 census
As of the census of 2010, there were 134 people, 65 households, and 34 families living in the city. The racial makeup of the city was 96.3% White and 3.7% from two or more races. Hispanic or Latino of any race were 5.2% of the population.

There were 65 households, of which 12.3% had children under the age of 18 living with them, 46.2% were married couples living together, 1.5% had a female householder with no husband present, 4.6% had a male householder with no wife present, and 47.7% were non-families. 36.9% of all households were made up of individuals, and 12.3% had someone living alone who was 65 years of age or older. The average household size was 2.06 and the average family size was 2.62.

The median age in the city was 51.2 years. 11.2% of residents were under the age of 18; 5.8% were between the ages of 18 and 24; 12.6% were from 25 to 44; 52.2% were from 45 to 64; and 17.9% were 65 years of age or older. The gender makeup of the city was 56.7% male and 43.3% female.

2000 census
As of the census of 2000, there were 232 people, 85 households, and 65 families living in the city. The population density was 222.0 people per square mile (86.1/km2). There were 116 housing units at an average density of 111.0 per square mile (43.1/km2). The racial makeup of the city was 92.67% White, 0.43% African American, 5.60% from other races, and 1.29% from two or more races. Hispanic or Latino of any race were 6.03% of the population.

There were 85 households, out of which 36.5% had children under the age of 18 living with them, 63.5% were married couples living together, 9.4% had a female householder with no husband present, and 23.5% were non-families. 16.5% of all households were made up of individuals, and 4.7% had someone living alone who was 65 years of age or older. The average household size was 2.73 and the average family size was 3.06.

In the city, the population was spread out, with 30.2% under the age of 18, 6.5% from 18 to 24, 30.2% from 25 to 44, 24.6% from 45 to 64, and 8.6% who were 65 years of age or older. The median age was 37 years. For every 100 females, there were 107.1 males. For every 100 females age 18 and over, there were 107.7 males.

The median income for a household in the city was $30,982, and the median income for a family was $32,500. Males had a median income of $22,250 versus $21,000 for females. The per capita income for the city was $12,405. About 12.5% of families and 17.1% of the population were below the poverty line, including 17.3% of those under the age of 18 and none of those 65 or over.

Education
Idanha is served by the Santiam Canyon School District.

Transportation
Idanha served as the eastern terminus of a transcontinental railroad, proposed by Colonel T. Egenton Hogg, that terminated in Idanha because of a lack of funding.  Idanha saw rail service until the 1950s, when the track was removed for development of Detroit Lake, situated over the historical roadbed of the former Oregon Pacific Railroad.

References

External links
 Entry for Idanha in the Oregon Blue Book
 

Cities in Oregon
Cities in Marion County, Oregon
Cities in Linn County, Oregon
Salem, Oregon metropolitan area
1949 establishments in Oregon